Rock for All Ages is the title of the only album released by Norman Barratt and Dave Morris. Barratt and Morris were members of the Barratt Band and recorded this album following the band's breakup. Barratt released a solo album, Barratt in 1988.

Track listing

Side one
 "Jerusalem" (Hubert Parry)
 "I Will Serve YOu" (Norman Barratt)
 "Evensong" (Dave Morris/Norman Barratt)
 "Lord we Thank You" (Norman Barratt)
 "Jacqueline Louise" (Norman Barratt)

Side two
 "Jesu Joy of Man's Desiring" (JS Bach)
 "On My Way Home" (Dave Morris/Norman Barratt)
 "Tribute" (Dave Morris)
 "Winds O'er the Sea" (Dave Morris/Norman Barratt)

Personnel
Norman Barratt: Guitar and Vocals
Dave Morris: Keyboards

Production notes
Produced by Norman Barratt, Dave Morris and Derek Murray
Engineered by Derek Murray
Mixed by Norman Barratt, Dave Morris and Derek Murray
Recorded at Chapel Lane Studios, Hampton Bishop, Hereford

References

1984 albums
Christian music albums by English artists